The Women's Division II NCAA Swimming and Diving Championships are college championship events in the USA. The event is held annually, and it consists of individual and team championships in a range of events in women's swimming and diving for swimmers from Division II universities. The meets take place in a 25-yard pool.

History
Swimming was one of twelve women's sports added to the NCAA championship program for the 1981–82 school year, as the NCAA engaged in battle with the Association for Intercollegiate Athletics for Women for sole governance of women's collegiate sports. The AIAW continued to conduct its established championship program in the same twelve (and other) sports; however, after a year of dual women's championships, the NCAA conquered the AIAW and usurped its authority and membership.

Champions

Source:

NCAA team titles

Championship records

|-bgcolor=#DDDDDD
|colspan=9|
|-

|-bgcolor=#DDDDDD
|colspan=9|
|-

|-bgcolor=#DDDDDD
|colspan=9|
|-

|-bgcolor=#DDDDDD
|colspan=9|
|-

|-bgcolor=#DDDDDD
|colspan=9|
|-

|-bgcolor=#DDDDDD
|colspan=9|
|-

See also
 NCAA Men's Division II Swimming and Diving Championships
 AIAW Intercollegiate Women's Swimming and Diving Champions
 List of college swimming and diving teams
 NCAA Women's Division I Swimming and Diving Championships
 NCAA Women's Division III Swimming and Diving Championships
 NAIA Women's Swimming and Diving Championships

References

Swimming And Diving, Women's
Swimming competitions in the United States
Women's sports in the United States